Banna Gupta is an Indian politician from Jharkhand, India and a Member of Jharkhand Legislative Assembly. He is the Health Minister of Jharkhand. He is also a minister in Hemant Soren cabinet.

References

External links 

Jharkhand politicians
Living people
Year of birth missing (living people)